Diego Alejandro Rolán Silva (born 24 March 1993) is a Uruguayan professional footballer who plays as a striker.

Club career

Defensor Sporting 
Rolan came up from the youth development squads of Defensor Sporting, being graduated to the first team in 2011. On 28 August 2011, he made his official debut in a 1–1 draw against Cerrito. On 13 November 2011, he scored his first official goal against Cerro Largo FC. His second goal came on 26 February 2012, in the 84th minute to take the lead for Defensor against Nacional in Montevideo which ended 2–2. On 23 September, he scored a hat-trick during a 4–1 win over Progreso. On 17 November, he scored another hat-trick, this time in a 4–0 win over Bella Vista.

Bordeaux 
After his breakthrough at the 2013 South American Youth Championship, several big teams in Europe were reportedly interested in signing Rolan. On 11 February 2013, he signed a contract with Ligue 1 side FC Girondins de Bordeaux.

Málaga (loan) 
On 29 August 2017, Rolan was loaned to La Liga side Málaga CF for one year.

Deportivo La Coruña 

On 17 July 2018, Bordeaux announced the transfer to Deportivo de La Coruña. The transfer fee was estimated at €6 million. Nine days later, he was loaned to CD Leganés in the first division for one year, with a buyout clause.

On 31 January 2019, Rolán left Leganés and moved to fellow league team Deportivo Alavés, on loan for the remainder of the season.

On 31 January 2021, Rolán moved to Egyptian club Pyramids FC on loan until the end of the season.

Return to Juárez
On 17 August 2021, Rolán signed with Liga MX side Juárez.

International career 
Rolan represented the Uruguay national under-20 football team at the 2011 FIFA U-20 World Cup in Colombia. In January 2013, he appeared at the 2013 South American Youth Championship in Argentina, scoring four goals to help Uruguay to the third place and qualification for the 2013 FIFA U-20 World Cup.

In September 2014, Rolan made his debut for the Uruguay national football team in a friendly win against Japan in Sapporo. He assisted Edinson Cavani's opening goal in the eventual 2–0 defeat of the Asian champions. His first senior international goal came in a 2–1 away victory over Chile on 18 November 2014.

In May 2015, Rolan was included in Uruguay's squad for the 2015 Copa América by coach Óscar Tabárez. He was assigned the number 9 shirt, usually worn by the suspended Luis Suárez. On 6 June, he scored the opening goal during a 5–1 pre-tournament friendly win over Guatemala in Montevideo.

Career statistics

Club

International

International goals

Honours

Bordeaux 

 Coupe de France: 2013

References

External links 

Profile at Bordeaux

1993 births
Living people
Afro-Uruguayan
Footballers from Montevideo
Association football forwards
Uruguayan footballers
Uruguay international footballers
Uruguay under-20 international footballers
Uruguayan Primera División players
Defensor Sporting players
Ligue 1 players
FC Girondins de Bordeaux players
La Liga players
Segunda División players
Málaga CF players
Deportivo de La Coruña players
CD Leganés players
Deportivo Alavés players
Liga MX players
FC Juárez footballers
Pyramids FC players
Expatriate footballers in France
Expatriate footballers in Spain
Expatriate footballers in Mexico
Expatriate footballers in Egypt
Uruguayan expatriate sportspeople in France
Uruguayan expatriate sportspeople in Spain
Uruguayan expatriate sportspeople in Mexico
Uruguayan expatriate sportspeople in Egypt
Uruguayan expatriate footballers
2015 Copa América players
Copa América Centenario players